Krucemburk (in 1949–1993 Křížová) is a market town in Havlíčkův Brod District in the Vysočina Region of the Czech Republic. It has about 1,600 inhabitants.

Administrative parts
Villages of Hluboká and Staré Ransko are administrative parts of Krucemburk.

References

Populated places in Havlíčkův Brod District
Market towns in the Czech Republic